Rifky Dwi Septiawan (born 3 February 2002) is an Indonesian professional footballer who plays as a defensive midfielder for Liga 1 club Persita Tangerang.

Club career

Persita Tangerang
Septiawan signed for Liga 1 club Persita Tangerang in 2021. He made his first-team debut on 11 September as a substitute against Persib Bandung. On 17 September, he scored his first league goal against Persela Lamongan. On 2 October, he scored again in a 2–2 draw with Borneo Samarinda.

Septiawan was away from club while serving in the Indonesian navy for nearly a year, returning in February 2023 against Persikabo 1973. He scored his first goal of the 2022–23 season on 2 March, opening the scoring in a 2–1 victory over former club PSS Sleman.

Career statistics

Club

Notes

References

External links
 Rifky Dwi Septiawan at Soccerway
 Rifky Dwi Septiawan at Liga Indonesia

2002 births
Living people
Indonesian footballers
Liga 1 (Indonesia) players
Persita Tangerang players
Association football midfielders
Indonesia youth international footballers
People from Tangerang
Sportspeople from Banten